Agassiziella angulipennis is a moth in the family Crambidae. It is found in India, where it was described from the Nilgiri district, as well as Sri Lanka. A. angulipennis has a wingspan of 14–17 mm, and was accidentally introduced to the United Kingdom. It has been naturalised to aquatic nurseries there.

The larvae feed on various water plants and live underwater.

References

Acentropinae
Moths of Asia
Moths of Sri Lanka
Moths described in 1891